Sparks Hall, also known as Women's Dormitory on the campus of Chadron State College in Chadron, Nebraska, was built in 1914 and was listed on the National Register of Historic Places in 1983.

It was designed by Lincoln, Nebraska, architect Alfred W. Woods.  It is a two-story wood-frame building with red brick veneer, on a raised basement.  It has a one-story covered porch.

It was the second building on the campus and served as the women's dormitory from 1914 to 1932 or 1933, when it was replaced in that role by Edna Work Hall.  It was then renamed "Sparks Hall", named for Joseph Sparks, the first president of the college, and began serving as the men's dormitory.

References

External links

University and college buildings on the National Register of Historic Places in Nebraska
Colonial Revival architecture in Nebraska
Buildings and structures completed in 1914
National Register of Historic Places in Dawes County, Nebraska
Chadron State College